Hilton Elementary School may refer to:

Hilton Elementary School (Newport News, Virginia)
Hilton Elementary School, Baltimore, Maryland, a school in the Baltimore City Public Schools